The flag that serves as the symbol of the German-speaking Community of Belgium, a federal community in Belgium, was adopted in 1990.

Design 
The flag of the German-speaking Community of Belgium is a banner of arms of coat of arms of the region. It consists of the white background. In the centre is placed a red lion, that stands on its back legs, have raised its front paws, and put its tongue out. Around it are placed in a circle nine gentiana flowers that have five intense blue petals and white (silver) round centres. According to a drawing attached to the establishing decree prescribing the flag, it should be square with proportions 1:1 or 13:15, but it is always used with 2:3 proportions instead.

The red lion alludes to the coat of arms of the Duchy of Luxemburg and the historical Duchy of Limburg, and symbolizes the historical affiliation of the German-speaking community to those states. The nine gentiana flowers represent the nine municipalities of the German-speaking community. Gentiana flowers grow in High Fens, an upland area and a nature reserve in the region. The crown further shows the allegiance of the German-speaking community of Belgium to the Kingdom of Belgium itself.

History 
In 1989, there was a call for proposals for a flag and coat of arms of the German-speaking Community of Belgium. The decree establishing the symbols was adopted on 1 October 1990 and published on 15 November 1990.

See also 
 Coat of arms of the German-speaking Community of Belgium
 National symbols of Belgium
 Flags of Belgium

References 

German-speaking Community of Belgium
German-speaking Community of Belgium
German-speaking Community of Belgium
German-speaking Community of Belgium
1990 establishments in Belgium
German-speaking Community of Belgium